Chircop may refer to:

Kirkop, also known as Chircop, a village in the Southern Region of Malta

People with the surname
Francesca Chircop (born 1993), Maltese footballer 
George Mifsud Chircop (1951–2007), Maltese linguist
Karl Chircop (1965–2008), Maltese doctor and politician
Lynn Chircop (born 1980), Maltese singer and television presenter
Rebecca Chircop (born 1988), Maltese footballer
Clint Chircop (born 1987), Maltese Actor

See also
Oreste Kirkop (also known as Oreste Chircop) (1923-1998), Maltese singer